Montfort School, Yercaud is a co-ed secondary school run by the Montfort Brothers of St. Gabriel in the town of Yercaud, near Salem in Tamil Nadu, India. The school motto is Virtus Et Labor, which translates to "Virtue and Labor". The colours are Blue and Gold.

Notable alumni
Mohan Sivanand – Editor-in-Chief, Reader's Digest India
Anbumani Ramadoss- Former Union Cabinet Minister for Health and Family Welfare
Shashi Tharoor- former Minister of State for Foreign Affairs; former UN Under-Secretary General for Communications and Public Information and author
John Victor Kennedy (Chiyaan Vikram ) – Actor
Roger Binny – All rounder in the World Cup winning Indian cricket team of 1983
 Nagesh Kukunoor, film-maker
 Jose K. Mani, politician
 Shanawas, Actor
 Jakes Bejoy, Musician

References

External links
Montfort Yercaud School Old Boys' Association
Montfort School Yercaud – Official Website

Brothers of Christian Instruction of St Gabriel schools
Catholic secondary schools in India
Christian schools in Tamil Nadu
High schools and secondary schools in Tamil Nadu
Education in Salem district
Educational institutions established in 1917
1917 establishments in India